Kalidas Chattopadhyay(), better known as Kali Mirza, was an 18th-century composer of tappā music in Bengal. A contemporary of Nidhu Babu, he composed over 400 tappās. He received his training in the cities of Delhi and Lucknow. He was born at Guptipara , Hooghly District in present-day West Bengal. His name, "mirza", comes from the Muslim clothes he often wore.

References

Indian male composers
18th-century Indian composers
Musicians from West Bengal